This is a list of wars involving the Kingdom of Sweden. There are legendary accounts of Swedish kings well into prehistory and they are mentioned by Tacitus in his Germania, but St. Olof Skötkonung (995–1022) was the first ruler documented to have been accepted by both the Swedes around Lake Mälaren and by the Geats around Lake Vättern. The modern state of Sweden considers itself to have been established on 6 June 1523 by the acclamation of Gustav Vasa as king which finally ended the Kalmar Union with Denmark, although the current Swedish constitution dates to 1974.

Military engagements since 1814 have not been formally declared wars.

Kingdom of Sweden (800–1521)

Kingdom of Sweden (1523–1611)

Swedish Empire (1611–1721)

Age of Liberty (1718–1772)

Gustavian era (1772-1809)

Kingdom of Sweden (1809–1814)

United Kingdoms of Sweden and Norway (1814–1905)

Kingdom of Sweden (1905–present)

See also
 Realm of Sweden
 Dominions of Sweden
 List of Swedish monarchs
 List of Swedish military commanders
 List of Swedish field marshals
 List of Swedish regiments

Notes

References

Citations

Bibliography

 
 
 
 
 
 
 

Wars involving Sweden
Sweden
Wars
Wars